The David L. King is a historic house at 2nd and Kelly Street in Hardy, Arkansas.  It is a two-story American Foursquare structure with a hip roof, and is fashioned from locally manufactured concrete blocks.  It has a hip-roofed porch extending across its front.  The house was built in 1919 for David L. King, a prominent lawyer in Sharp County, and is distinctive as a rare example of residential concrete block construction in the community.

The house was listed on the National Register of Historic Places in 2002.

See also
National Register of Historic Places listings in Sharp County, Arkansas

References

Houses on the National Register of Historic Places in Arkansas
Houses completed in 1919
Houses in Sharp County, Arkansas
National Register of Historic Places in Sharp County, Arkansas